Margaret Garritsen de Vries (1922-2009) was an economist and historian known for her work for the International Monetary Fund.

Education
deVries received her B.A.  from the University of Michigan and her Ph.D. from the Massachusetts Institute of Technology (MIT) in 1946, under the direction of Paul Samuelson.

International Monetary Fund career
She was among the first employees of the International Monetary Fund in 1946. She represented the agency on missions to many countries around the world, and became a division chief at the fund in 1957, nearly twenty years before any other women did the same.  After leaving the fund as an economist as a condition of adopting her children, she returned part-time as a historian of the institution, eventually serving as the IMF's official historian from 1973 until her retirement in 1987.

Awards and legacy
She was awarded the Carolyn Shaw Bell Award in 2002 in recognition of her work mentoring women in the economics profession.

The American Economic Association established the Margaret deVries Memorial Fund in her memory in 2010.  This fund is used to pay registration fees for graduate students whose papers have been selected for presentation session at the AEA Annual meetings sponsored by the Committee on the Status of Women in the Economics Profession.  In addition, MIT established the Margaret Garritsen deVries Scholarship Fund to assist female graduate students in the field of economics.

Selected works

References 

American women economists
20th-century American economists
University of Michigan alumni
Massachusetts Institute of Technology alumni
Economic historians
International economists
1922 births
2009 deaths
International Monetary Fund people
American officials of the United Nations
20th-century American women
21st-century American women